Wild bean is a common name for several plants and may refer to:

Phaseolus, a genus in the family Fabaceae
Strophostyles helvula, a species of bean in the family Fabaceae
Strophostyles umbellata, a species of bean in the family Fabaceae